"Drown In My Mind" is the second single from Story Untold's debut album Waves.

Background
Lead vocalist Janick Thibault states, "Drown In My Mind is the song that was the easiest to write for me. It's just so personal to me and also felt like a huge relief. The past few years of my life have been hard for me on a personal level and back when I had my hard times, I wish I would've had a song like that to listen to that would've basically told me "it's ok to feel like that". Musically I think it sets the mood for the whole album. Our album that is called "Waves" is definitely more mature lyrically and musically than what we put out in the past. I think it's the perfect balance between catchy fun pop punk songs and more mature heartfelt songs. We hope you guys are gonna dig the songs as much as we do!"

Track listing
 Digital download
 "Drown In My Mind" – 3:00

Personnel
 Janick Thibault – lead vocals, songwriting
 Jessy Bergy – lead guitar 
 Jonathan Landry – drums
 Max Cloutier – rhythm guitar
 Aiden Von Rose – bass guitar

References

External links

2018 singles
2018 songs
Hopeless Records singles